Beryx is a genus of alfonsinos found in deep oceanic waters. Two of its member species, B. decadactylus and B. splendens, are found across nearly the entire globe and are of some commercial importance.

Species
There are currently three recognized species in this genus:
 Beryx decadactylus G. Cuvier, 1829 (Alfonsino)
 Beryx mollis T. Abe, 1959
 Beryx splendens R. T. Lowe, 1834 (Splendid alfonsino)

References

 
Marine fish genera
Taxa named by Georges Cuvier